Telephone numbers in Bolivia, a landlocked country in South America, use the international calling code of +591, and the area codes range from 2–7, depending on the location calling. The regulator of the numbers is Autoridad de Fiscalización y Control Social de Telecomunicaciones y Transportes - ATT.

List of area codes in Bolivia

External links
 Information on the 2001 number plan (Spanish)

Bolivia
Communications in Bolivia
Telephone